The Zenica Synagogue  (Bosnian: Sinagoga u Zenici) was a Jewish Synagogue that existed in the town of Zenica, Bosnia and Herzegovina between the years of 1903 and 1941. Today it is a National monument of Bosnia and Herzegovina.

History 
While the history of the Jews in Bosnia and Herzegovina dates back to the Expulsion of Jews from Spain in 1492, Jews did not settle in Zenica until 1750. Most of these early settlers were Sephardic Jews. They were joined in 1878 by Ashkenazi Jews from Austria-Hungary. By 1885, the community had built a synagogue next to the local bazaar and a Jewish cemetery outside of the city. The current synagogue building was built between 1904 and 1907. In 1910 the Jewish community in Zenica was 297, with about 200 living in the city on the eve of the Invasion of Yugoslavia.

185 members of the Zenica Jewish community were killed in the Holocaust, and those who returned to their homes after the war were unable to rebuild the demolished synagogue building themselves, so the building took on other roles. Zenica Ironworks used the building to house their printing house, and in the 1960s the building housed a furniture store. In 1968 the Jewish Community of Yugoslavia reached an agreement with the city to turn the building into a local museum.

Description 
The building of the Zenica Synagogue was based on Neo-Moorish Architecture and measured 10.2x18.5 m.

References 

Synagogues in Bosnia and Herzegovina
Sephardi Jewish culture in Bosnia and Herzegovina
Sephardi synagogues
Former synagogues
Buildings and structures completed in 1907
Moorish Revival synagogues